The Tonkin frog (Odorrana bacboensis) is a species of frogs in the family Ranidae. It is found in northern Vietnam and in adjacent southern China (Yunnan and Guangxi provinces). The specific name is derived from Bac Bo, the Vietnamese name for northern Vietnam, as the species was first described from there.

Description
Male Tonkin frogs measure  (based on just two specimens) and females  in snout–vent length. Skin on the dorsum is shagreened with heavy granulations. The dorsum, flanks, and loreal region are brown with small black spots that get larger on the flanks. The upper and lower lips are creamy yellow with vertical black bars. The venter is creamy white, sometimes with light spotting. The iris is golden, and the margin of pupil has a striking yellow and red border.

Reproduction
This species probably breeds in the autumn. The male has gular pouches, but the call is unknown. Unusually, the eggs are black, indicating that they are laid in places where they are exposed to sunlight to promote development.

Habitat
Natural habitats are forested montane river systems.

References

Odorrana
Frogs of Asia
Frogs of China
Amphibians of Vietnam
Amphibians described in 2003
Taxa named by Amy Lathrop
Taxa named by Robert W. Murphy
Taxa named by Nikolai Loutseranovitch Orlov
Taxonomy articles created by Polbot